Robert de Schepper (27 July 1885 – 12 May 1940) was a Belgian fencer. He competed in the individual and team foil events at the 1920 Summer Olympics. He was killed in action during World War II.

References

External links
 

1885 births
1940 deaths
Belgian male fencers
Belgian foil fencers
Olympic fencers of Belgium
Fencers at the 1920 Summer Olympics
Belgian military personnel killed in World War II
Sportspeople from Ghent